Hillcrest is a suburb of the contiguous Auckland metropolitan area located in New Zealand. Since 2010, it has been under the jurisdiction of the Auckland Council, and is located in the North Shore, surrounded by Glenfield, Wairau Valley, Northcote and Birkenhead. The Auckland Northern Motorway passes to the east.

Demographics

Hillcrest had a population of 10,548 at the 2018 New Zealand census, an increase of 732 people (7.5%) since the 2013 census, and an increase of 1,026 people (10.8%) since the 2006 census. There were 3,471 households, comprising 5,079 males and 5,466 females, giving a sex ratio of 0.93 males per female, with 1,920 people (18.2%) aged under 15 years, 2,424 (23.0%) aged 15 to 29, 4,944 (46.9%) aged 30 to 64, and 1,263 (12.0%) aged 65 or older.

Ethnicities were 55.0% European/Pākehā, 6.7% Māori, 3.2% Pacific peoples, 40.0% Asian, and 3.4% other ethnicities. People may identify with more than one ethnicity.

The percentage of people born overseas was 46.8, compared with 27.1% nationally.

Although some people chose not to answer the census's question about religious affiliation, 51.8% had no religion, 34.4% were Christian, 0.2% had Māori religious beliefs, 2.6% were Hindu, 1.5% were Muslim, 2.5% were Buddhist and 2.0% had other religions.

Of those at least 15 years old, 3,123 (36.2%) people had a bachelor's or higher degree, and 804 (9.3%) people had no formal qualifications. 1,857 people (21.5%) earned over $70,000 compared to 17.2% nationally. The employment status of those at least 15 was that 4,542 (52.6%) people were employed full-time, 1,308 (15.2%) were part-time, and 288 (3.3%) were unemployed.

Education

Notes

External links
 Sunnybrae Normal School website
 Willowpark School website
 Photographs of Hillcrest held in Auckland Libraries' heritage collections.

Suburbs of Auckland
North Shore, New Zealand
Kaipātiki Local Board Area